Parliamentary elections were held in the Federated States of Micronesia on 2 March 1993. All candidates for seats in Congress ran as independents.

Results

References

Micronesia
1993 in the Federated States of Micronesia
Elections in the Federated States of Micronesia
Non-partisan elections
March 1993 events in Oceania